Parliamentary elections were held in Bolivia on 4 June 1962. The Revolutionary Nationalist Movement (MNR) received 85% of the vote, and retained its large majority in both houses of Congress.

Results

See also
Bolivian National Congress, 1960–1962

References

Elections in Bolivia
Bolivia
1962 in Bolivia
Election and referendum articles with incomplete results